The Rumaila oil field is a super-giant oil field  located in southern Iraq, approximately  from the Kuwaiti border.  Discovered in 1953 by the Basrah Petroleum Company (BPC), an associate company of the Iraq Petroleum Company (IPC), the field is estimated to contain 17 billion barrels, which accounts for 12% of Iraq's oil reserves estimated at 143.1 billion barrels. Rumaila is said to be the largest oilfield ever discovered in Iraq and is considered the third largest oil field in the world.

Under Abd al-Karim Qasim, the oilfield was confiscated by the Iraqi government by Public Law No. 80 of 11 December 1961.   Since then, this massive oil field has remained under Iraqi control. The assets and rights of IPC were nationalised by Saddam Hussein in 1972, and those of BPC in 1975. The dispute between Iraq and Kuwait over alleged slant-drilling in the field was one of reasons for Iraq's invasion of Kuwait in 1990.

The oil field requires regular investment to manage its reservoir. To maintain steady output, 200,000 barrels a day of lost production has to be replaced every year.

North Rumaila is called  "the cemetery" by the locals.  A local environmental scientist told the BBC that cancer here is so rife it is "like the flu".

Ownership
The field is owned by Iraq and subcontracted to BP and CNPC under Iraq Producing Field Technical Service Contract (PFTSC). BP is an operator of the project with 47.6% while CNPC and SOMO hold 46.4% and 6%, respectively. BP and CNPC will recover a renumerated fee of $2 per barrel in profits which will account to 15 to 20% rate of return on investment. Iraqi government and BP agreed to cut the initial bidding price per barrel from $3.99 to $2.00 in June 2009. The US changed its status of forces agreement the same month, starting to depart from Iraq. ExxonMobil which also bid on servicing this field at a price $4.80 walked away due to price cutting terms by the Iraqi Government leaving BP and CNPC as winners of the contract. BP expects the costs will begin to be recovered after the production will be raised by 10% from the current output. The rehabilitation and expansion project will be managed by Rumaila Field Operating Organization (ROO) which will be staffed mainly from PETROFAC employees, a wide range of international oilfield service providers, and smaller number of experts from BP and CNPC.

An estimated $15 billion will be spent on enhancing the operations at Rumaila over the next 20 years.

Production
Currently ~270 production wells are operating at Rumaila. BP and CNPC intend to raise the production to  within the next six years. Once this production milestone is reached, Rumaila will become the second largest oil field in the world after the Saudi Arabian Ghawar oil field. However, it is likely that the target for peak production is cut down to between 1.8-2.2 million barrels per day (bpd), the Iraqi oil ministry and oil industry sources said. 
The field produced  in 2019.

Production Facilities

Oil production is operated by Rumaila Operating Organisation, with 14 "degassing stations" currently installed - 7 in the North field and 7 in the South field. These stations provide 3-phase separation (oil, water & natural gas). Crude oil is sent by pipeline to local refineries or ports in Basrah for export. Natural gas is provided to the Basrah Gas Company. Water is disposed into disposal wells. Degassing station names:
 North Rumaila: DS1, DS2, DS3, DS4, DS5, NIDS, SIDS
 South Rumaila: Markezia (Rumaila), Janubia, Shamyah, Qurainat, Mishrif Shamyah, Mishrif Qurainat, Ratqa

Drilling contracts
In early 2010, BP subcontracted deals valued at around $500 million to Weatherford International, consortium of Schlumberger and Iraqi Drilling Co, and Daqing Oilfield Company Limited from China to drill 49 new wells at Rumaila. Weatherford is going to drill seven wells while partnership of Schlumberger and Iraqi Drilling Co, and Daqing Oil Field Co will drill 21 wells each.

In February 2011, Conceptual Design, Front End Engineering Design (FEED), Minimum Work Obligations and Integrated Project Management Team (IPMT) services contract was awarded to WorleyParsons

Reserves
Rumaila reportedly holds an estimated  of oil; which accounts for 12% of Iraq's oil reserves, estimated at 143.1 billion barrels. At current production rate of 1,330,000 barrels per day (211,000 m3/d), the reserves-to-production ratio is 35 years.

Importance 
Rumaila oil field was critical in the 1990 Gulf War.  Iraq, after accusing Kuwait of allegedly side-drilling under Iraqi soil, launched an attack on Kuwait on 2 August 1990. In addition, Kuwait had been producing quantities of oil, which were above treaty limits established by OPEC.
In fact, before the Iraqi occupation of Kuwait in 1990, Kuwait has drilled only 8 vertical wells in its part of the Rumaila field and the production was limited due to different technical problems. The issue for Kuwait was territorial more than oil. Kuwait never drilled deviated wells that crossed the Iraqi borders. After the liberation of Kuwait in 1991, the United Nation border demarcation committee went back to the historical data and shifted the Kuwaiti border toward the north which meant that Iraq was producing from Kuwaiti territory.

During the Iraq Invasion in 2003, the Iraqi Army laid an 18 km long defensive minefield across it, which contained an estimated 100,000 mines. The Iraqi Army also set fire to parts of the oil field as a defensive maneuver.

Camps in North Rumaila Oil Field
There are many oil field companies camps for their staff in North rumaila oil field.
Weatherford City North Rumaila
British Petroleum camp in North Rumaila

Cancer-risk
Gas, a by-product from the oil-extraction, is burned openly, which produces cancer-linked pollutants. The Iraqi law prohibit gas-burning less than 10 km from people's homes, but BBC found in 2022 gas was being burned as close as 350 meters from people's homes. A leaked report from Ministry of Health (Iraq) blamed air pollution for 20% rise in cancer in Basra between 2015 and 2018. The Iraqi Ministry of Health has banned its employees from speaking about the health damage. Iraqi Environment Minister Jassem al-Falahi later admitted that "pollution from oil production is the main reason for increases in local cancer rates." None of the affected locals have gotten any compensation.

See also

Ghawar Field
Majnoon oil field
West Qurna Field

References

External links
 Rumaila Operating Organisation official website
 Rumaila Operating Organisation official Facebook page

BP oil and gas fields
Oil fields of Kuwait
Oil fields of Iraq
Oil field disputes
Territorial disputes of Kuwait
Territorial disputes of Iraq